Pereiaslav or Pereyaslav, formerly Pereiaslav-Khmelnytskyi or Pereyaslav-Khmelnytskyy (1943–2019), is a historical city in the Boryspil Raion, Kyiv Oblast (province) of central Ukraine, located near the confluence of Alta and Trubizh rivers some  south of the nation's capital Kyiv. Along with Kyiv and Chernihiv, it forms the nucleus of the medieval Ruthenia. Pereiaslav hosts the administration of Pereiaslav urban hromada, one of the hromadas of Ukraine. Its population is approximately 

With its current estimated population about 30,000, and more than 20 museums, Pereiaslav is often described as a "living museum" and granted status of a History and Ethnography Reserve.

History

Kievan Rus'
Pereiaslav played a significant role in the history of Ukraine. It was mentioned for the first time in the text of the Rus' Treaty with the Byzantine Empire (911) as Pereyaslav-Rus'kyi (Pereyaslav Ruthenian/Pereyaslav Russiae), to distinguish it from Pereslavets in Bulgaria, later with establishment cities in Zalesye, from Pereslavl-Zalessky and Pereyaslavl Ryazansky. Vladimir I, Prince of Kiev built here in 992 the large fortress to protect the southern limits of Kievan Rus' from raids of nomads from steppes of what is now southern Ukraine. The city was the capital of the Principality of Pereiaslavl' from the middle of the 11th century until its demolition by Tatars in 1239, during the Mongol invasion of Kievan Rus'.

Lithuania and Poland
During the 14th century Pereiaslav was annexed by the Grand Duchy of Lithuania. Since 1471 it was part of the Kiev Voivodeship, which in 1569 became part of the Crown of the Kingdom of Poland. In 1585, Polish King Stephen Báthory granted Perejasław Magdeburg city rights. It was a royal city of Poland.

Cossack Ukraine
During the second half of the 16th century Pereiaslav became a regimental city of the Ukrainian Cossacks. Here in 1654 Bohdan Khmelnytsky had the controversial "Pereiaslav Convent", where the Ukrainian Cossacks had voted for a military alliance with Muscovy and accepted the Treaty of Pereyaslav. The treaty resulted in the establishment of the Cossack Hetmanate in left-bank Ukraine subject to the Tsardom of Russia, and to the Russo-Polish War (1654-1667). The town known as Pereiaslav at that time, and later as Pereiaslav-Poltavskyi. According to the Truce of Andrusovo in 1667, Pereiaslav became part of Russia.

Soviet museum center
Upon the end of World War II, the Soviet government, keen to glorify the Treaty of Pereiaslav as the ground for Ukraine's unification with Russia, renamed Pereiaslav to Pereiaslav-Khmelnytskyi in October 1943 to stress Bohdan Khmelnytskyi's role of that event. Later, the otherwise obscure town was established as a dedicated museum and tourism center. By the request of the Pereiaslav-Khmelnytskyi City Council the Ukrainian parliament reinstated the city to its historic name Pereiaslav in October 2019.

Until 18 July 2020, Pereiaslav was incorporated as a city of oblast significance and served as the administrative center of Pereiaslav-Khmelnytskyi Raion even though it did not belong to the raion. In July 2020, as part of the administrative reform of Ukraine, which reduced the number of raions of Kyiv Oblast to seven, the city of Pereiaslav was merged into Boryspil Raion.

Economy 
There is a major river port in the city, working as part of Kyiv River Port.

Notable people from Pereiaslav

 Sholem Aleichem (1859–1916), Jewish-Ukrainian Yiddish writer and playwright
 Meir Blinken (1879–1915), Jewish-American writer
 Hanna Knyazyeva-Minenko (born 1989), Ukrainian and Israeli triple jumper and long jumper
 Louise Nevelson (1899–1988), American sculptor
 Pavlo Teteria (1620s–1670), Ukrainian Hetman

Landmarks
The most significant landmarks of Pereiaslav are:
 Museum of Folk Architecture and Household Traditions in Middle Naddnipryanschina, presenting the architecture and traditions of Ukrainians from ancient times until the 19th century, which includes submuseums: Museum of Bread, Museum of Land Transportation, Museum of Rushnyks (Ukrainian Decorative Towels), Museum of Space Exploration, Museum of Postal Services, Museum of Beekeeping, Museum of Applied and Decorative Arts, Museum of Ukrainian Traditional Rituals, Museum of Archeology, Museum of the Cossack Glory, Museum of Trypillya Culture, Museum of Ukrainian Traditional Dress, etc.
 Excavated ruins of buildings from the 10–11th centuries.
 St. Michael's church (1646–66).
 Ascension monastery (with cathedral built in 1695–1700).

Jewish community
The first mention of the Jewish community of Pereiaslav dates to 1620, when the townspeople complained to King Sigismund of the growing number and influence of Jews in Pereiaslav. Denying Jews the right to keep breweries, malt-houses and distilleries, having already prohibited them to engage in farming, the King ordered his commissioners to consider the other rights of Jews. Three years later, an agreement was signed allowing the Jews to enjoy all of the rights and liberties of urban citizens. This agreement was confirmed by King Sigismund.

Pereiaslav Jews were among the first to be killed during the first Khmelnytskyi uprising. Chronicler Nathan Hannover writes: «And a lot of holy communities, based not far from the place of battle and unable to flee, like the holy communities of Pereiaslav, Baryshivka, Pyryatin, Borispil, Lubny, Lokhvitsa and the surrounding communities, died as martyrs of various cruel and heinous kinds of slaughter...» («Yeven metsula», p. 94). Another chronicler, Rabbi Meir of Schebrzheschina, provides a detailed story: «The sacred community of Pereiaslav had drunk from the cup of bitterness several times; perplexed Jews fled to the sacred community of Borisovka (NB. probably Baryshivka). But the rebels also came there and slaughtered many Jews including infants. The local non-Jews pitied those who survived and brought them back to Pereiaslav, where they remained locked up like prisoners in their homes, because they were afraid to be seen by the rebels. At night they did not know what the morning would bring, and in the morning - what the evening promised».

Famous Yiddish author Sholom Aleichem was born in Pereiaslav in 1859. He spent his childhood in the town of Voronkiv, but when the family became impoverished he returned to Pereiaslav, where he studied at the Russian gymnasium until 1876. In 1879 he again returned to Pereiaslav for several years. The town is described in detail in his autobiographical prose. In the town's 'ethnographic reserve', there is a museum dedicated to him.
Additional Comments:  ...After the 1654 Pereiaslav Council, the remnants of the Pereiaslav Jewish community became patronized by Russia. The left-bank Jews were allowed to stay in their homes, but the townspeople of Pereiaslav presented to Tsar Alexei Mikhailovich the law of 1620 limiting the rights of Jews, which was confirmed by the Tsar. Information about Pereiaslav Jews disappears from the same year 1654.

A new community developed during the late 18th century. According to the tax books of 1801, there were 5 Christian merchants, no Jewish merchants; 844 Christian townspeople and 66 Jewish townspeople. According to the audit of 1847 there was only one "Pereiaslavskoe' Jewish community in the district, consisting of 1,519 people. According to the census of 1897, there were 185,000 inhabitants in the district, among them 9,857 Jews, including in Pereiaslav - 14,614 residents, of whom 5,754 were Jews. In 1910, three Jewish schools operated in Pereiaslav: first grade primary boys school, a private boys school, and a Talmud-Torah. At the end of the 19th century, the synagogue was built, it survived the war and has preserved until now – the factory of woven products named after B. Khmelnitsky is operating there.

On 30 June – 2 July 1881 there was a pogrom against the Jews in Pereiaslav. Among the victims were Jews who had fled here after the Kyiv pogrom. From Pereiaslav, the unrest spread to the surrounding areas. In June 1919, Ataman Zeleniy arranged a pogrom in Pereiaslav and 20 people were killed. By 1921, a Jewish 'self-defense' organisation had been founded in Pereiaslav. In 1926, the Jewish community was flourishing despite the persecution and there were 3,590 Jews in Pereiaslav. At this time, there were 8 houses of study (batei midrash), 3 different Jewish schools, and 26 kosher butchers. During autumn 1941, on the outskirts of the city (the present territory of the Altitsky cemetery), 800 Jewish residents of Pereiaslav were shot. According to elderly residents, the exact date of the shooting was 4–5 November, however, the memorial plate indicates a different date – 6–8 October. On 19 May 1943, after a raid, 7 more Jewish women and 1 man were shot, and buried in the Altitsky cemetery.

The current Jewish population of Pereiaslav numbers fewer than 100. The community office is located in the building of the former synagogue.

International relations

Twin towns – Sister cities
Pereiaslav is twinned with:

  Mozhaysk, Russia
  Pereslavl-Zalessky, Russia
  Vileyka, Belarus
  Mtskheta, Georgia
  Paide, Estonia
  Kočani, North Macedonia

Gallery

Notes

References

 
Severians
Cities in Kyiv Oblast
Pereyaslavsky Uyezd
Kiev Voivodeship
Cities of regional significance in Ukraine
Cossack Hetmanate
Holocaust locations in Ukraine
Populated places on the Dnieper in Ukraine
Populated places established in the 10th century
Dnieper Ukraine
Rus' settlements